Baranovskaya is a rural locality (a village) in Semizerye Rural Settlement, Kaduysky District, Vologda Oblast, Russia. The population was 137 as of 2002. There are 3 streets.

Geography 
Baranovskaya is located 61 km northwest of Kaduy (the district's administrative centre) by road. Korotnevaya is the nearest rural locality.

References 

Rural localities in Kaduysky District